"Strange Magic" is a song written Jeff Lynne and performed by Electric Light Orchestra (ELO). It was released on their 1975 Face the Music album.

Released as a single in 1976, the single was edited in the US, whereas in the UK the song appeared as the album cut minus the orchestral intro. The US single edit can be found on the remastered Face the Music released in September 2006. The song was also included on the band's 1978 The ELO EP. A remastered version was included on the box set Flashback in 2000. The 'weeping' guitar lick was provided by keyboardist Richard Tandy while Jeff Lynne played a 12-string acoustic guitar fed through a phase shifter. The song has been described as psychedelic.

Critical reception
AllMusic's Donald A. Guarisco considered it one of the best tracks on their "breakthrough" album Face the Music, praising Jeff Lynne's skill at "creating ballads that are as memorably hook-laden as his uptempo pop tunes", noting the "stunning intro full of swirling strings, some George Harrison-styled slide guitar riffs". Billboard considered it to be an "easy rocker" with "smooth vocals and skillful string arrangements." Record World said that "an immaculate production by Jeff Lynne maintains the high calibre of the group's recorded work."

Chart performance

Weekly charts

Year-end charts

Certifications

Jeff Lynne version
Jeff Lynne re-recorded the song in his own home studio in 2012. It was released in a compilation album with other re-recorded ELO songs, under the ELO name.

References

External links

1975 songs
1976 singles
1970s ballads
Electric Light Orchestra songs
Jet Records singles
Song recordings produced by Jeff Lynne
Songs written by Jeff Lynne